John Francis Regis Toomey (August 13, 1898October 12, 1991) was an American film and television actor.

Early life
Born in Pittsburgh, Pennsylvania, he was one of four children of Francis X. and Mary Ellen Toomey, and attended Peabody High School. He initially pondered a law career, but acting won out and he established himself as a musical stage performer.

Career
Educated in dramatics at the University of Pittsburgh, where he became a brother of Sigma Chi, Toomey began as a stock actor and eventually made it to Broadway. Toomey was a singer on stage until throat problems (acute laryngitis) while touring in Europe stopped that aspect of his career. In 1929, he appeared in his first films, starting out as a leading man, but finding more success as a character actor, sans his toupee.

In 1941, Toomey appeared in You're in the Army Now, in which Jane Wyman and he had the longest screen kiss in cinema history: 3 minutes and 5 seconds.

In 1956, Toomey was cast as the Reverend Arnold Grumm in the episode "Lifeline" of the religion anthology series, Crossroads. Toomey appeared in a number of episodes of Richard Diamond, Private Detective as Lt. McGough.

About this time, he  appeared on the NBC Western series, The Tall Man, starring Barry Sullivan and Clu Gulager. He also made two guest appearances on Perry Mason, including the role of murderer Sam Crane in the 1960 episode, "The Case of the Loquacious Liar", and as Andy Grant in the 1965 episode "The Case of the 12th Wildcat".

From 1963 to 1966, Toomey was one of the stars of the ABC crime drama, Burke's Law, starring Gene Barry. He played Sergeant Les Hart, one of the detectives assisting the murder investigations of the millionaire police captain Amos Burke. Toomey also appeared in the CBS western series, Rawhide episode "Incident of the Tinkers Dam" as TJ Wishbone. He guest-starred on dozens of television programs, including the popular "Shady Deal at Sunny Acres" episode of ABC's Maverick.

In 1968, after the death of Bea Benaderet, who played Kate Bradley, Toomey played a transitional role in the CBS series Petticoat Junction.  Appearing as Dr. Stuart, who cared for the citizens of Hooterville, the character decided to take on a partner in his medical practice.  Dr. Janet Craig, played by June Lockhart, was introduced as the new female lead for the show in the episode "The Lady Doctor".

Toomey died at age 93 on October 12, 1991, while in residence at the Motion Picture & Television Country House and Hospital, in Woodland Hills, California.

Selected filmography

Alibi (1929) as Danny McGann
The Wheel of Life (1929) as Lt. MacLaren
Illusion (1929) as Eric Schmittlap
Rich People (1929) as Jef MacLean
Street of Chance (1930) as 'Babe' Marsden
Framed (1930) as Jimmy McArthur
Crazy That Way (1930) as Robert Metcalf
The Light of Western Stars (1930) as Bob Drexell
Shadow of the Law (1930) as Tom Owens
Good Intentions (1930) as Richard Holt
A Man from Wyoming (1930) as Jersey
Other Men's Women (1931) as Jack
Scandal Sheet (1931) as Regan
Finn and Hattie (1931) as Henry Collins
The Finger Points (1931) as Charlie 'Breezy' Russell
Kick In (1931) as Chick Hewes
Murder by the Clock (1931) as Officer Cassidy
Graft (1931) as Dustin Hotchkiss
24 Hours (1931) as Tony 'Sicily' Bruzzi
Touchdown (1931) as Tom Hussey
Under Eighteen (1931) as Jimmie Slocum
Shopworn (1932) as David Livingston
Midnight Patrol (1932) as John Martin
The Crowd Roars (1932) as Dick Wilbur (uncredited)
They Never Come Back (1932) as Jimmy Nolan
A Strange Adventure (1932) as Detective-Sergeant Mitchell
The Penal Code (1932) as Robert Palmer
State Trooper (1933) as Michael Rolph
Soldiers of the Storm (1933) as Brad Allerton
Laughing at Life (1933) as Pat Collins / Mc Hale
She Had to Say Yes (1933) as Tommy Nelson
Big Time or Bust (1933) as Jimmy Kane
 What's Your Racket? (1934) as Bert Miller
Picture Brides (1934) as Dave Hart
Murder on the Blackboard (1934) as Detective Smiley North
She Had to Choose (1934) as Jack Berry
Redhead (1934) as Scoop
Red Morning (1934) – John Hastings
Shadow of Doubt (1935) as Reed Ryan
Great God Gold (1935) as Phil Stuart
G Men (1935) as Eddie Buchanan
One Frightened Night (1935) as Tom Dean
Manhattan Moon (1935) as Eddie
Shadows of the Orient (1935) as Inspector Bob Baxter
Reckless Roads (1935) as Speed Demming
Bars of Hate (1935) as Ted Clark
Skull and Crown (1935) as Bob Franklin
Bulldog Edition (1936) as Jim Hardy
Midnight Taxi (1937) as Hilton
The Lady Escapes (1937) as American Reporter (uncredited)
Big City (1937) as Fred Hawkins
Back in Circulation (1937) as Buck
Submarine D-1 (1937) as Tom Callan
The Invisible Menace (1938) as Lt. Matthews
Island in the Sky (1938) as Joe – Reporter (uncredited)
Blind Alibi (1938) as Doctor Wilson – Veterinarian (uncredited)
Hunted Men (1938) as Donovan (uncredited)
Passport Husband (1938) as G-Man (uncredited)
Illegal Traffic (1938) as Windy
His Exciting Night (1938) as Bill Stewart
Smashing the Spy Ring (1938) as Ted Hall
Pirates of the Skies (1939) as Pilot Bill Lambert
The Mysterious Miss X (1939) as Jack Webster
Wings of the Navy (1939) as First Flight Instructor
Society Smugglers (1939) as Johnny Beebe
Street of Missing Men (1939) as Jim Parker
Confessions of a Nazi Spy (1939) as Tom - in Coffee Shop (uncredited)
Union Pacific (1939) as Paddy O'Rourke
 Trapped in the Sky (1939) as Lt. Gary
Indianapolis Speedway (1939) as Dick Wilbur
Hidden Power (1939) as Mayton
Thunder Afloat (1939) as Ives
The Phantom Creeps (1939) as Jim Daly
His Girl Friday (1940) as Sanders
Northwest Passage (1940) as Webster
'Til We Meet Again (1940) as Freddy
North West Mounted Police (1940) as Constable Jerry Moore
Arizona (1940) as Grant Oury
The Lone Wolf Takes a Chance (1941) as Wallace (uncredited)
Meet John Doe (1941) as Bert
The Devil and Miss Jones (1941) as 1st Policeman
A Shot in the Dark (1941) as William Ryder
Reaching for the Sun (1941) as Interne
The Nurse's Secret (1941) as Inspector Tom Patten
Dive Bomber (1941) as Tim Griffin
Law of the Tropics (1941) as Tom Marshall
New York Town (1941) as Jim Martin (uncredited)
They Died with Their Boots On (1941) as Fitzhugh Lee
You're in the Army Now (1941) as Captain Radcliffe
Bullet Scars (1942) as Dr. Steven Bishop
I Was Framed (1942) as Bob Leeds
The Forest Rangers (1942) as Frank Hatfield
Tennessee Johnson (1942) as Blackstone McDaniel
Tornado (1943) as Narrator (uncredited)
Destroyer (1943) as Lt. Cmdr. Clark
Adventures of the Flying Cadets (1943) as Capt. Ralph Carson
Jack London (1943) as Scratch Nelson
Phantom Lady (1944) as Detective
Follow the Boys (1944) as Dr. Henderson
Song of the Open Road (1944) as Connors
Raiders of Ghost City (1944, Serial) as Captain Clay Randolph [Chs. 1–6]
The Doughgirls (1944) as Timothy Walsh as FBI Agent
Dark Mountain (1944) as Steve Downey
When the Lights Go On Again (1944) as Bill Regan as Reporter
Murder in the Blue Room (1944) as Inspector McDonald
Betrayal from the East (1945) as Agent Posing - 'Sgt. Jimmy Scott'
Strange Illusion (1945) as Dr. Vincent
Spellbound (1945) as Det. Sgt. Gillespie
Follow That Woman (1945) as Barney Manners
Mysterious Intruder (1946) as James Summers
The Big Sleep (1946) as Chief Inspector Bernie Ohls
Her Sister's Secret (1946) as Bill Gordon
Sister Kenny (1946) as New York Reporter (uncredited)
Child of Divorce (1946) as Ray Carter
The Thirteenth Hour (1947) as Don Parker
The Guilty (1947) as Detective Heller
The Big Fix (1947) as Lt. Brenner
High Tide (1947) as Inspector O'Haffey
Magic Town (1947) as Ed Weaver
The Bishop's Wife (1947) as Mr. Miller
Reaching from Heaven (1948) as Pastor
I Wouldn't Be in Your Shoes (1948) as Police Inspector Clint Judd
Raw Deal (1948) as Police (uncredited)
Station West (1948) as Goddard
The Boy with Green Hair (1948) as Mr. Davis
Mighty Joe Young (1949) as John Young
Come to the Stable (1949) as Monsignor Talbot
The Devil's Henchman (1949) as Tip Banning
Beyond the Forest (1949) as Sorren
Dynamite Pass (1950) as Dan Madden
Undercover Girl (1950) as Hank Miller
Again Pioneers (1950) as Dave Harley
Mrs. O'Malley and Mr. Malone (1950) as Reporter in Light Jacket (uncredited)
Frenchie (1950) as Carter
Tomahawk (1951) as Smith (uncredited)
Cry Danger (1951) as Cobb
Navy Bound (1951) as Capt. Charles Danning
Show Boat (1951) as Sheriff Ike Vallon (uncredited)
The Tall Target (1951) as Insp. Tim Reilly (uncredited)
The People Against O'Hara (1951) as Fred Colton, Police Sound Man
The Battle at Apache Pass (1952) as Dr. Carter
My Six Convicts (1952) as Dr. Gordon
Just for You (1952) as Mr. Hodges
My Pal Gus (1952) as Farley Norris
Never Wave at a WAC (1953) as Gen. Ned Prager
It Happens Every Thursday (1953) as Mayor Hull
Son of Belle Starr (1953) as Tom Wren
Island in the Sky (1953) as Sgt. Harper
Main Street to Broadway (1953) as Desk Sergeant (uncredited)
Take the High Ground! (1953) as Chaplain (uncredited)
The Nebraskan (1953) as Col. Markham
The High and the Mighty (1954) as Tim Garfield
Drums Across the River (1954) as Sheriff Jim Beal
The Human Jungle (1954) as Det. Bob Geddes
Guys and Dolls (1955) as Arvide Abernathy
Top Gun (1955) as Jim O'Hara
Great Day in the Morning (1956) as Father Murphy
Three for Jamie Dawn (1956) as 'Murph'
Dakota Incident (1956) as Minstrel
Curfew Breakers (1957) as Coach Bettger
Sing, Boy, Sing (1958) as Rev. Easton
Joy Ride (1958) as Miles
Shady Deal at Sunny Acres (1958) as Ben Granville
The Hangman (1959) as Orderly (uncredited)
Warlock (1959) as Skinner
Guns of the Timberland (1960) as Sheriff Taylor
The Last Sunset (1961) as Milton Wing
The Big Bankroll (1961) as Bill Baird
Voyage to the Bottom of the Sea (1961) as Dr. Jamieson
The Errand Boy (1961) as Studio Exec with the Baron
Man's Favorite Sport? (1964) as Bagley
The Night of the Grizzly (1966) as Cotton Benson
Gunn (1967) as The Bishop
Change of Habit (1969) as Father Gibbons
The Out-of-Towners (1970) as Pilot on Airliner to New York
Cover Me Babe (1970) as Michael
The Carey Treatment (1972) as Sanderson the Pathologist
The Phantom of Hollywood (1974, TV Movie) as Joe
Won Ton Ton, the Dog Who Saved Hollywood (1976) as Burlesque Stagehand
Evil Town (1977) as Doc Hooper
C.H.O.M.P.S. (1979) as Chief Patterson

References

External links

1898 births
1991 deaths
American male film actors
Male actors from Pittsburgh
University of Pittsburgh alumni
American male stage actors
American male radio actors
20th-century American male actors
Warner Bros. contract players
Male actors from Los Angeles